Santosh Nandy (born 1932) is a former football player, who played for India men's national football team. He was part of the team that won gold medal at the 1951 Asian Games. He scored a goal against Afghanistan in a 3–0 win.

Honours

India
Asian Games Gold medal: 1951

References

External links
 

1932 births
Living people
Indian footballers
India international footballers
Footballers from Kolkata
Footballers at the 1948 Summer Olympics
Olympic footballers of India
Footballers at the 1951 Asian Games
Medalists at the 1951 Asian Games
Asian Games gold medalists for India
Asian Games medalists in football
Association football forwards
Calcutta Football League players